Dirk van den Bosch (14 August 1906 – 20 December 1994) was a Dutch sports shooter. He competed in the 25 m pistol event at the 1936 Summer Olympics.

References

1906 births
1994 deaths
Dutch male sport shooters
Olympic shooters of the Netherlands
Shooters at the 1936 Summer Olympics
Sportspeople from The Hague